Nocticola pheromosa is a species of cockroach in the family Nocticolidae. Nocticola pheromosa are found in Singapore. The species is named after Pheromosa, a Pokémon that resembles a feminine anthropomorphic cockroach.

References

Blattodea
Insects of Singapore
Insects described in 2022